

Events

February events
 February 22 – Tretten train disaster: A head-on collision near Tretten station in Norway kills 27.
 February 28 – Moorgate tube crash on the London Underground: A train accelerates into a dead-end tunnel at Moorgate station killing 43.

March events
 March 10 – Sanyo Shinkansen opens between Osaka and Fukuoka. Travel time between the two cities is reduced to 2 hours 30 minutes, and from Fukuoka to Tokyo to 5 hours.
 March 10 – Kosei Line, between Yamashina of Kyoto and Tsuruga route open, with Osaka-Kanazawa, Niigata route express train, through changed from via Hikone, Nagahama route.

April events
 April 1 – The second American Freedom Train tour begins, powered by newly restored Southern Pacific 4449, in Wilmington, Delaware.  See also American Freedom Train - 1975-76 station stops.
 April 16 – In Portugal, Decree-Law 205-B/175 is published, nationalising the  Companhia dos Caminhos de Ferro Portugueses.

June events
 June 6 – An overnight northbound passenger train from London, England, bound for Glasgow, Scotland, does not receive warning of a temporary speed restriction resulting in the Nuneaton rail crash.
 June 8 – Two trains collide on a single-track stretch between Lenggries and Munich due to a dispatcher's error. Forty-one die and 122 are injured.

July events
 July 1 – Australian National Railways Commission takes over assets of Commonwealth Railways.
 July 18 – Barcelona Sants railway station opens.
 July 19 – Hatton Cross tube station opens, the first stage of the extension of London Underground's Piccadilly line to London Heathrow Airport.

August events
 August 5 – The first Amfleet passenger cars enter service on the Northeast Corridor. They are Amtrak's first new intercity passenger cars and the Budd Company's last.
 August 10 – British Rail's Advanced Passenger Train achieves 245 km/h (152.3 mph) between Goring and Uffington on the Western Region.

September events
 September 24 – Scottish-built ex-État 140C 287 on hire to CFTA works a train from its depot at Gray, Haute-Saône, to Sainte-Colombe, the last commercial steam-hauled working on French railways.
 September 27 – Official opening of the National Railway Museum in York, England.

October events
 October 19 – US-built SNCF Class 141R 1187 of Vénissieux depot works a special return working between Lyon and Veynes, the last steam-hauled passenger train operated by SNCF.
 October 24 – The first through passenger train over the TAZARA Railway arrives in Dar es Salaam, marking completion of this Chinese-funded   gauge link between Tanzania and Zambia.

November events
 November – English-built SNCF Class 140C 38 works a freight train between its depot at Gray and Chalindrey, the last steam-hauled train operated by SNCF.

December events
 December 2 – A train hijacking takes place at the village of Wijster in the Netherlands by activists wanting to endorse the self-proclaimed Republic of South Maluku in the Maluku Islands. Hostages Hans Braam, Leo Bulter and Bert Bierling are shot. The activists surrender on December 14.
 December 14 – Japanese National Railways runs its last official steam-hauled passenger train, from Muroran to Iwamizawa on Hokkaido with JNR Class C57-135.

Unknown date events
 The Chicago, Rock Island and Pacific Railroad files its third and final bankruptcy.
 Last steam locomotive operated by State Railways of Finland.
 As a result of the Independent Safety Board Act's passage the previous year, the United States National Transportation Safety Board becomes a completely independent agency, severing all organizational ties to the national Department of Transportation and all of its modal agencies.

Accidents

Births

Deaths

References